The Storm of the century is a term usually applied to a particularly damaging or notable weather event (such as a blizzard or hurricane) during a specific century.  It may refer to:

Weather events
 Eastern Canadian blizzard of March 1971 - Nicknamed the "Storm of the Century" in Quebec.
 Labor Day Hurricane of 1935
 Great Appalachian Storm of November 1950
 Perfect Storm (1991)
 1993 Storm of the Century – A powerful superstorm/nor'easter that impacted that Eastern United States, and was given the title Storm of the Century

Screenplay
 Storm of the Century, 1999 horror TV miniseries written by Stephen King

See also
Superstorm